Goff Memorial is a public artwork by French artist Jules Déchin, located at Rock Creek Cemetery in Washington, D.C., United States. Goff Memorial was originally surveyed as part of the Smithsonian's Inventories of American Painting and Sculpture. This memorial serves as the burial site of Thomas Trueman Goff.

Description

The Goff Memorial shows a male figure, made of bronze, seated on a tomb. He wears a loosely draped long hooded robe and raises his proper left hand over his head as he gazes upwards. The sculpture sits upon a long, flat granite base with an inscription plaque on the top, the burial of Mr. Goff.

The sculpture is signed: J DECHIN PARIS 1922

Gallery

References

Monuments and memorials in Washington, D.C.
Outdoor sculptures in Washington, D.C.
1922 sculptures
Bronze sculptures in Washington, D.C.